Karlovica is a settlement southwest of Velike Lašče in central Slovenia. The Velike Lašče area is part of the traditional region of Lower Carniola and is included in the Central Slovenia Statistical Region.

References

External links

Karlovica on Geopedia

Populated places in the Municipality of Velike Lašče